Abdul Rashid bin Asari is a Malaysian politician from the Malaysian United Indigenous Party (BERSATU), a component party of the ruling Perikatan Nasional (PN) coalition at the federal level and opposition at the state level. He served as the Selangor State Executive Councillor in the Pakatan Harapan (PH) state administration under Menteris Besar Mohamed Azmin Ali and Amirudin Shari from May 2018 to his removal in March 2020 when he switched his allegiance to the state opposition PN coalition.

Election results

Honours 
  :
  Commander of the Order of Loyalty to the Royal Family of Malaysia (PSD) – Datuk (2001)
  :
  Companion of the Order of the Crown of Selangor (SMS)

References 

Living people
People from Selangor
Malaysian people of Malay descent
Malaysian Muslims
Malaysian United Indigenous Party politicians
21st-century Malaysian politicians
Members of the Selangor State Legislative Assembly
Selangor state executive councillors
1951 births
Commanders of the Order of Loyalty to the Royal Family of Malaysia
Former United Malays National Organisation politicians